Mariano González Zarur (born 3 April 1949) is a Mexican politician affiliated with the Institutional Revolutionary Party who was Governor of Tlaxcala, 2011-2016. As of 2014 he served as Senator of the LVIII and LIX Legislatures of the Mexican Congress representing Tlaxcala and as Deputy of the LX Legislature.

References

1949 births
Living people
Politicians from Tlaxcala
Governors of Tlaxcala
Members of the Senate of the Republic (Mexico)
Members of the Chamber of Deputies (Mexico)
Institutional Revolutionary Party politicians
20th-century Mexican politicians
21st-century Mexican politicians
National Autonomous University of Mexico alumni
Municipal presidents in Tlaxcala
Mexican accountants
People from Apizaco